Dijamanti... (English translation: Diamonds...) is the third studio album of Bosnian singer Halid Bešlić. It was released in 1984.

Track listing
 (I don't want, I don't want Diamonds)
 (Cold snow is coming)
 (Always, always be happy)
 (Three roses)
 (I remember)
 (Hug me gently)
 (Guitars in the night)     
 (Why is that birch sad?)

External links
Dijamanti... on Discogs

References

Halid Bešlić albums
1984 albums